

This is a list of the National Register of Historic Places listings in Gila County, Arizona.

This is intended to be a complete list of the properties and districts on the National Register of Historic Places in Gila County, Arizona, United States. The locations of National Register properties and districts for which the latitude and longitude coordinates are included below, may be seen in a map.

There are 53 properties and districts listed on the National Register in the county, including 1 that is also a National Historic Landmark.

Current listings

|}

Former listings

|}

See also

 List of National Historic Landmarks in Arizona
 National Register of Historic Places listings in Arizona

References

Gila